Maracha may refer to one of the following

 Maracha District, a district in the West Nile sub-region of Northern Uganda
 Maracha Town, a town in Maracha District, where the district headquarters are located
 Maracha people, a subset of Lugbara people
 Maracha language, a dialect of Lugbara language.